Step by Step is the second album by Australian singer Linda George.

Track listing

Shoo Be Doo Be Doo Da Day (Stevie Wonder / Henry Cosby/ Sylvia Moy)
New York City
Drift Away (Mentor Williams)
Goin' Thru Some Changes (Mike Settle)
California Free (Mike Settle)
Step By Step (Bias Boshell)
Home Made Love (Don Covay)
Old Time Feeling (Tom Jans / Will Jennings)
You Put Something Better Inside (Gerry Rafferty / Joe Egan)
I Wanna Hear Music
Goin' Through The Motions

Charts

Album credits

Producer: Jack Richardson for Nimbus Nine Productions

References

1975 albums
Linda George (Australian singer) albums